Khalid Kareem (born April 28, 1998) is an American football defensive end for the Indianapolis Colts of the National Football League (NFL). He played college football at Notre Dame.

Early years
Kareem attended Harrison High School in Farmington, Michigan. He committed to the University of Notre Dame to play college football.

College career
Kareem played at Notre Dame from 2016 to 2019. During his career, he had 108 tackles and 13 sacks.

Professional career

Kareem was selected by the Cincinnati Bengals with the 147th overall pick in the fifth round of the 2020 NFL Draft. He was placed on the active/non-football injury list on July 27, 2020. He was activated on August 23, 2020. In Week 11 against the Washington Football Team, Kareem recorded his first career sack on Alex Smith during the 20–9 loss.

On September 2, 2021, Kareem was placed on injured reserve. He was activated on October 30.

On September 1, 2022, Kareem was placed on injured reserve with a hamstring injury. He was activated on October 10, then waived the next day and re-signed to the practice squad.

Indianapolis Colts
On November 22, 2022, Kareem was signed by the Indianapolis Colts off the Bengals practice squad.

References

External links
Notre Dame Fighting Irish bio

1998 births
Living people
African-American Muslims
Players of American football from Detroit
American football defensive ends
Notre Dame Fighting Irish football players
Cincinnati Bengals players
Indianapolis Colts players